The Chicago Helicopter Airways Flight 698 was a scheduled domestic helicopter service between Chicago Midway Airport and Chicago O'Hare Airport. On 27 July 1960 it was operated by a Sikorsky S-58C helicopter which departed Chicago Midway Airport with two pilots and 11 passengers. It crashed at Forest Home Cemetery, Forest Park, Illinois killing all on board.

Accident
The helicopter had arrived from Chicago O'Hare Airport at 22:15 CDT. It then departed on the return journey at 22:30 CDT in VFR weather conditions. During the flight, part of one of the main rotor blades broke away and the helicopter descended to attempt an emergency landing. The tail cone and tail rotor broke away and the helicopter spun nose-down into the ground at the Forest Home Cemetery in Forest Park and burst into flames.

Investigation
The Civil Aeronautics Board determined that N879 crashed as a result of structural disintegration in flight and caused by a fatigue fracture of the main rotor blade.

Aircraft
The helicopter was a Sikorsky S-58C built in 1957 and registered in the United States as N879. It was delivered to New York Airways in January 1957 it was later sold to Chicago Helicopter Airways.

Reference

Aviation accidents and incidents in the United States in 1960
Accidents and incidents involving the Sikorsky S-58
Airliner accidents and incidents in Illinois
1960 in Illinois
July 1960 events in the United States
Midway International Airport